José Servando Chávez Hernández (23 October 1936 – 11 November 2014) was a Mexican lawyer and politician from the Institutional Revolutionary Party who served as Governor of Michoacán from 1970 to 1974. He also served as Deputy of the Chamber of Deputies of Mexico from 1964 to 1967.

References

1936 births
2014 deaths
Politicians from Michoacán
20th-century Mexican lawyers
Governors of Michoacán
Members of the Chamber of Deputies (Mexico)
Institutional Revolutionary Party politicians